"Wild Eyes" is the 11th single by Japanese voice actress and singer Nana Mizuki, released on May 18, 2005.

The single reached number 13 on the Japanese Oricon charts.

Track listing
Wild Eyes
Lyrics: Nana Mizuki
Composition, arrangement: Junpei Fujita (Elements Garden)
Ending theme for anime television series Basilisk

Lyrics: Nana Mizuki
Composition, arrangement: Junpei Fujita (Elements Garden)
Ending theme for anime television series Basilisk
76th Star
Lyrics: Nokko and Sawa Chihiro
Composition: Akio Dobashi
Arrangement: Kōta Igarashi
Opening theme for Drama CD Itazura na Kiss

Lyrics: Nana Mizuki
Composition, arrangement: Kōta Igarashi
Ending theme for Drama CD Itazura na Kiss

Charts

Nana Mizuki songs
2005 singles
Songs written by Nana Mizuki
2005 songs
King Records (Japan) singles